Anne-Monika Spallek (born 16 January 1968) is a German politician for the Alliance 90/The Greens and since 2021 is a member of the Bundestag, the federal diet.

Life and politics 
Spallek was born in 1968 in the West German town of Nottuln and became a member of the Bundestag in 2021.

References 

Living people
1968 births
21st-century German politicians
21st-century German women politicians
Members of the Bundestag 2021–2025
Alliance 90/The Greens politicians
People from Coesfeld (district)